KPRV (1280 AM) is a radio station broadcasting an adult standards music format. Licensed to Poteau, Oklahoma, United States, it serves the Ft. Smith, Arkansas, area. The station is currently owned by Leroy and JoAnn Billy. The station's studios and property were located at a house, which is a former site of a Drive-in theater in Poteau.

History
Originally established in 1953 as KLCO, KPRV is a family-owned and operated radio station which features Adult Standards ("America's Best Music") 24 hours a day, 7 days a week.

Owners LeRoy and JoAnn Billy provide local communities with current weather and news. The station also provides coverage of local sporting events

External links
KPRV official website 

PRV
Adult standards radio stations in the United States